Ballini is an Italian surname. Notable people with the surname include:

 Camillo Ballini (1540–c.1592), Italian painter of the late-Renaissance or Mannerist period
 Marco Ballini (1998), Italian-Thai professional footballer
 Matias Ballini (born 1988), Argentine professional footballer
 Roberto Ballini (born 1944), Italian former racing cyclist

See also
 Ballin (disambiguation)

Italian-language surnames